Wolfgang Schmitt (26 February 1939 – 13 July 2017) was a German boxer. He competed in the men's lightweight event at the 1964 Summer Olympics.

References

1939 births
2017 deaths
German male boxers
Olympic boxers of the United Team of Germany
Boxers at the 1964 Summer Olympics
Sportspeople from Mainz
Lightweight boxers